The SRC (short for the Scot Richard Case) was an American, Detroit-based psychedelic rock band, from the late 1960s. From 1966 to 1972, they were a staple at many Detroit rock venues, such as the Grande Ballroom.

Early years
The SRC was formed by Scott Richardson, the Chosen Few lead singer, with local band The Fugitives, which featured Glenn Quackenbush, Gary Quackenbush and E.G. Clawson, all of whom were based in Ann Arbor, Michigan and Robin Dale, bass guitar and vocals, the only British member of the group. Jeep Holland, manager of The Rationals, became their manager and suggested Richardson as lead singer. Bass player Al Wilmot joined later. With Wilmot on bass, SRC recorded Milestones and Travelers Tales. Richard Haddad was the bass player on their final album with Capitol Records and was the bass player on the Lost Masters album released in 1985.

Scott Richardson years
Upon the addition of Richardson, the original line-up included: Scott Richardson (vocals), Steve Lyman (rhythm guitar and vocals), Gary Quackenbush (lead guitar), Glenn Quackenbush (organ), Robin Dale (bass and vocals) and E.G. Clawson stage name for Scott Williamson (drums). Richardson was influenced by the Pretty Things and based the SRC stage show on this. The band recorded its first single "Who's That Girl"/"I'm So Glad", the latter a cover of the Cream version of a Skip James song, and released it to moderate reviews. However, fan reaction was good enough for the band's members to choose to drop out of Eastern Michigan University to work on their music, a risk at the time as draft-eligible men were potentially subject to mandatory military duty in Vietnam. Robin Dale (stage name) was drafted into the Marine Corps. in October 1969.

Soon the band's sound became more psychedelic, influenced by the likes of Procol Harum, for whom the band would later open. Their self-titled debut album was released by Capitol Records, and the single "Black Sheep"/"Morning Mood" from this album drew fan and media praise. "Black Sheep", considered a psychedelic masterpiece, was released only in mono for the single, as an abridged version. The album version, featured a longer midsection with additional verses.

"Marionette", "Onesimpletask", and "Refugee" offer additional examples of the expanded guitar and keyboard style developed by the Quackenbush brothers Gary (guitar) and Glenn (Hammond organ), along with their musically adventurous bandmates.

With growing popularity, the band split from Holland and began to open in and around Detroit for several national and international artists such as Jimi Hendrix, Traffic, The Who, The Rolling Stones, Janis Joplin and The Mamas & the Papas among others. Soon after the success of their first record the band began to work on a second album. Milestones was released in March 1969. From this album they released the single "Up All Night" / "Turn Into Love" (Capitol) in 1969.

Robin Dale was replaced by Al Wilmot and Lyman would exit the band before Milestones was completed or released. Milestones was perhaps the band's best attempt at commercial and mainstream success and charted in the Billboard 200, but never reached any position to help SRC break out of the Detroit or Ann Arbor area on to more national success.

Before the start of Traveler's Tale Gary Quackenbush was, in his own words, in a "severe" motorcycle accident that had him hospitalized.

Final years
With a new line-up featuring a single guitarist, Ray Goodman, in place of both Gary Quackenbush and Steve Lyman, SRC recorded and released Traveler's Tale, its third and final LP. Showcasing a stylistic shift away from psychedelic rock and toward prog rock.

In the time leading up to the break-up, there were attempts to record without several key members of the band; the results of these sessions remained unreleased for several years. With the group's popularity dwindling, Goodman was released. Soon, the band added Richard Haddad (also known as "Shemp") on bass; he was soon replaced by Byron Coons.

In desperation the band changed its name to 'Blue Scepter', and released a cover version of the Pretty Things' "Out in the Night". After it failed to generate any interest, the band broke up.

After the breakup
In the years following the breakup of the SRC each member went on to his own personal success. Richardson relocated to Los Angeles and became involved in films. He served as writer on Hearts of Fire, which starred Bob Dylan and worked on sets for two of The Lord of the Rings films. Gary Quackenbush went on to start SRC Records and continued to session around the country. While all the members had a wonderful experience while involved in SRC and marginal success elsewhere, in other bands (such as Richardson who later worked with Ray Manzarek of the Doors), none of them were ever involved in a group more noted than this. "Shemp" Haddad was killed in a road accident in California and E.G. Clawson resides in Porterville, California, and is still playing the drums. Haddad's death led to SRC releasing Lost Masters, half of which includes the demos featuring Haddad's work. Gary Quackenbush passed away in 2015.

In 2010, SRC was voted into the Michigan Rock and Roll Legends Hall of Fame.

Discography

Singles
"I'm So Glad"/ "Who Is That Girl" (as "The Scot Richard Case", 1967, A-Square)
"Get the Picture" (as "The Old Exciting Scot Richard Case")/ "I Need You" (by "The Early Rationals") (1967, A-Square)
"Black Sheep" / "Morning Mood" (1968, Capitol Records)
"Up All Night" / "Turn Into Love" (1969, Capitol Records)
"Never Before Now" / "My Fortune's Coming True" (1970, Capitol Records)
"Born to Love" / "Badaz Shuffle" (1971, Big Casino Records)
"Out in the Night" / "Gypsy Eyes" (as "Blue Scepter", 1972, Rare Earth Records)

Albums
SRC (1968, Capitol Records)
Milestones (1969, Capitol Records)
Traveler's Tale (1970, Capitol Records)
Lost Masters (includes 1970 recordings for a fourth album, 1993, One Way Records)

Re-releases
Milestones (1991, One Way Records)
Traveler's Tale (1993, One Way Records)
SRC (1993, One Way Records)
"Black Sheep" (2000, RPM)
As Blue Scepter
 Capitol Records released a two CD set, SRC that includes the band's first three albums, SRC, Milestones, and Travelers Tale, as well as a bonus track, My Fortune's Coming True in 2012.

Nicknames
SRC was known on the street in Milwaukee, Wisconsin, as "Striped Red Candy".

References

Bibliography
Grit, Noise, and Revolution: The Birth of Detroit Rock 'n' Roll, David Carson (University of Michigan Press, 2006)

External links
 SRC website
 SRC history at Furious.com
 Official website of founding member and bass player Robin Dale

Psychedelic rock music groups from Michigan
Musical groups from Detroit
Music of Ann Arbor, Michigan
Musical groups established in 1966
1966 establishments in Michigan